Institut des Risques Industriels, Assurantiels et Financiers (in English : Institute of Industrial, Insurantial and Financial Risk), or IRIAF, is a component of University of Poitiers. It is situated in Niort, France.

The institute is composed of two faculties: Risk Management and Statistics for Health and Insurance. The two departments comply each other to provide a different approaches of risk management, from technical and mathematical point of views.

History

It was established in 1989 by University of Poitiers - Niort campus - offering a Bachelor's degree in Risk Management. They also created another faculty of Statistics for Health and Insurance, offering the same level of Bachelor's degree. It was not until 1996 that the two faculties were combined together and IRIAF was born. And at that moment, the two faculties were equally given permission by French Ministry of Education to offer Master's degree. Later in 2001, it has finally become an independent component of University of Poitiers and being called officially with the same name. And in January 2009, IRIAF moved to its new building in Niort.

Faculties

Faculty of risk management

Students of the faculty are trained to be a manager in the domains of environment, health and safety, and also quality management. They are exposed to hazard identification, risk assessment, and risk control, and the subjects taught include the set up of ISO 9001, ISO 14001, ISO 31000 and OHSAS 18001 management systems.

Faculty of statistics for health and insurance
The subjects taught include the mathematical bases of statistics, actuary and econometry. The students of the faculty are provided with knowledges in modelization and data processing, applied in the domains of health and insurance.

International exchange
Since 2001, IRIAF has developed a partnership with University of Central Lancashire (United Kingdom), University of Moncton and Université de Sherbrooke (Canada)  by offering a postgraduate double major in risk management. Students from IRIAF may finish their last semester of master's degree in these partner universities and vice versa. It has also built conjoint programs with University of Iaşi (Romania), University of Ouagadougou (Burkina Faso), University of Sfax (Tunisia), University of Damascus (Syria) and University of Maria Curie-Skłodowska (Poland) in term of scientific researches.

External links
Institut des Risques Industriels, Assurantiels et Financiers

Niort
University of Poitiers
Educational institutions established in 1989
Insurance industry organizations
1989 establishments in France